In thought experiments, philosophers and scientists occasionally imagine entities with special abilities as a way to pose tough intellectual challenges or highlight apparent paradoxes.  Examples include:
 Descartes’ malicious demon – Cartesian skepticism (also called methodological skepticism) advocates the doubting of all things that cannot be justified through logic. Descartes uses three arguments to cast doubt on our ability to know objectively: the dream argument, the deceiving God argument, and the malicious demon argument. Since our senses cannot put us in contact with external objects themselves, but only with our mental images of such objects, we can have no absolute certainty that anything exists in the external world. In the evil demon argument Descartes proposes an entity who is capable of deceiving us to such a degree that we have reason to doubt the totality of what our senses tell us.
 Laplace's demon is a hypothetical all-knowing being who knows the precise location and momentum of every atom in the universe, and therefore could use Newton's laws to reveal the entire course of cosmic events, past and future.  Based upon the philosophical proposition of causal determinism.
 Maxwell's demon can distinguish between fast and slow moving molecules.  If this demon only let fast moving molecules through a trapdoor to a container, the temperature inside the container would increase without any work being applied.  Such a scenario violates the second law of thermodynamics.
 Morton's demon stands at the gateway of a person's senses and lets in facts that agree with that person's beliefs while deflecting those that do not. This demon is used to explain the phenomenon of confirmation bias.
 In aphorism 341 of The Gay Science, Nietzsche puts forth his eternal recurrence concept.  In it, he employs a demon with special metaphysical knowledge as an agent for forcing reevaluation of perspective on one's own life.
 The Darwinian Demon is a hypothetical organism which can simultaneously maximize all aspects of its fitness.
The demon of Bureaucratic Chaos is the phenomenon that "blocks good things from happening" at the United States Department of Energy. This hypothesized entity makes it extremely difficult to complete complex projects — by frequently changing mission requirements, funding, and strategic direction. Examples include the Mirror Fusion Test Facility, which was constructed but never turned on; the Superconducting Super Collider, which cost $2 billion before its cancellation; and ITER, the international fusion experiment in France that the United States has alternately supported and opposed, and to which it has threatened withdrawal, cut funding, and increased funding over the decades.

Similar entities
There are other creatures which feature in thought experiments about philosophy. One such creature is a utility monster, a creature which derives much more utility (such as enjoyment) from resources than other beings, and hence under a strict utilitarian system would have more or all of the available resources directed to it. Newcomb's paradox supposes a being who is believed to be capable of predicting human behavior; Robert Nozick suggested a "being from another planet, with an advanced technology and science, whom you know to be friendly".

References

Thought experiments
Fictional demons and devils